The currant shoot borer moth (Lampronia capitella) is a species of moth of the family Prodoxidae. It is found in most of central, northern and eastern Europe. It is also found in North America.

Description 
The wingspan is 14–17 mm. Adults have chocolate-brown wings with creamy markings and a yellowish-orange head tuft. They are on wing from May to mid-July.

The larvae feed on the young green fruit of Ribes rubrum, Ribes uva-crispa and Ribes nigrum. Larvae can be found from August to September. The species then overwinters in the larval stage near the roots of the host plant. In spring, the larvae bore in the young new buds of their host plant.

References

Moths described in 1759
Prodoxidae
Moths of Europe
Moths of North America
Taxa named by Carl Alexander Clerck